Hedieh Tehrani (born June 25, 1972) is an Iranian actress. She is most noted for willingness to play mysterious, stony-faced and cold-hearted women. She has received various accolades, including two Crystal Simorgh, four Hafez Awards, an Iran Cinema Celebration Award and an Iran's Film Critics and Writers Association Award.

Career 
Mohammad Reza Sharifinia and Azita Hajian were the first ones to propose her a role for The Fateful Day. She auditioned for acting in The Fateful Day but refused to cooperate and the role went to Ladan Mostofi. Before acting in The King, she refused a part in Leila directed by Iranian director Dariush Mehrjui. Kianoush Ayari then approached her for acting in his movie, To Be or Not to Be and again she refused to play. Masoud Kimiayi was the first director who succeeded to have her playing in his film The King.

Personal life
The actress was arrested in 2016, in Tehran's central Lala Garden for campaigning for Animal Rights, due to the gathering not being authorized by the government. The protest was organized after several Iranian municipalities put down a number of street dogs due to over population. The arrest has been condemned by some activists.

Filmography

Film

Web

Awards and nominations

Notes and references

External links

Iranian film actresses
People from Tehran
1972 births
Living people
Crystal Simorgh for Best Actress winners
21st-century Iranian actresses
20th-century Iranian actresses
Actresses from Tehran
Recipients of the Order of Culture and Art